The 2008 NAPA Auto Parts 200 presented by Dodge race was the second running of the NAPA Auto Parts 200, a discontinued NASCAR Nationwide Series race held on August 2, 2008, at Circuit Gilles Villeneuve in Montreal, Quebec. The race was the 23rd of the 2008 NASCAR Nationwide Series season.

The pole position was won by Scott Pruett of Chip Ganassi Racing, while the race was won by JR Motorsports' Ron Fellows. The race was the first points race in NASCAR history to be run with grooved rain tires.

Background
The race was the second running of the NAPA Auto Parts 200, with Kevin Harvick winning the inaugural event in 2007. The track, Circuit Gilles Villeneuve, was one of two international tracks on the 2008 Nationwide schedule, along with Autódromo Hermanos Rodríguez in Mexico City.

Various road course ringers ran in the race, including Patrick Carpentier, Ron Fellows, Max Papis, Scott Pruett, Boris Said,  Scott Gaylord and  Jacques Villeneuve.

Qualifying
The remaining top ten comprised Ron Fellows, Boris Said, Steve Wallace, Brad Coleman and Joey Logano. The lone driver to not qualify for the race was Kevin O'Connell.

Race
The race started at 3:30 EST, with pole-sitter Scott Pruett leading until lap 7, in which the caution flag flew for rain, followed by the red flag on the following lap. As a result, most teams added windshield wipers to the cars, while grooved rain tires were installed. Rain tires had been previously used in practice and qualifying for the 1997 NASCAR Thunder 100 exhibition race at Suzuka Circuit, and also in 1999 by the Camping World Truck Series during a practice at Watkins Glen International. At one point, Carl Edwards was seen trying to use what appeared to be a Swiffer mop to try cleaning his windshield, possibly during the first caution.

The race was paused for about an hour before restarting. On lap 14, Marcos Ambrose took the lead, leading for a race high 27 laps until he was penalized for speeding in pit road. Jacques Villeneuve took the lead on lap 41, which he subsequently relinquished to Ron Fellows on the following lap. Fellows held the lead for seven laps until the race was called due to severe rain on lap 48. On the same lap, Villeneuve, who did not have a wiper installed, collided with another car's rear; Joey Logano also crashed on the lap, hitting a car without brake lights. Patrick Carpentier finished second, followed by Ambrose, Ron Hornaday Jr., and Boris Said. The top ten was rounded out with Edwards, Jason Leffler, Greg Biffle, Clint Bowyer and Steve Wallace.

Results

Standings after the race

References

NAPA Auto Parts 200
NAPA Auto Parts 200
NAPA Auto Parts 200
2000s in Montreal
2008 in Quebec
NASCAR races at Circuit Gilles Villeneuve